The 1934 Washington & Jefferson Presidents football team was an American football team that represented Washington & Jefferson College as an independent during the 1934 college football season. The team compiled a 4–5 record and was outscored by a total of 108 to 87. Hank Day was the head coach.

Schedule

References

Washington and Jefferson
Washington & Jefferson Presidents football seasons
Washington and Jefferson Presidents football